USS Auk may refer to:

 , laid down on 20 June 1918 at New York City.
 , laid down on 15 April 1941 at Portsmouth, Virginia.

References 

United States Navy ship names